The common end of myriad good deeds (萬善同歸) is a Buddhist phrase and title of a work by Yongming Yanshou, a Zen master. He compiled 114 , cleverly integrating the doctrines of Buddhist Zen, Lotus, Tiantai, Xianshou, and other sects into one whole, ultimately leading together to Pure land, so that the doctrines of all sects are cited. This is why we refer to the doctrines of all the religions, so that they are called "all goodness in one".

References 
 永明延壽《萬善同歸集》 (Yongming Yanshou, Collected Works)

Further reading 
 Franklin Albert Welter, The Meaning of Myriad Good Deeds: A Study of Yung-ming Yen-shou and the Wan-shan T'ung-kuei Chi, Ph.D thesis, McMaster University, November 1986.

Buddhist terminology

zh:萬善同歸所